The Measure of All Things is a 2014 documentary film co-directed by Sam Green and yMusic. The film had its premiere at the 2014 Sundance Film Festival on January 20, 2014.

Synopsis
The film explores the fascination of people of all over the world with the Guinness Book of World Records.

Reception
The Measure of All Things received positive reviews from critics. Dennis Lim in his review for The New York Times said that "(it is) a singular experience, and a collective one, with the potential for human connection and human error." Susan Gerhard  of Fandor, praised the film by saying that "Sam Green has long taken joy at unpacking utopian promises of the past, many deluded, others inspired, and offering them up for re-evaluation and appreciation."

References

External links
 Official website
 
 

2014 films
2014 documentary films
American documentary films
2010s English-language films
2010s American films